Manfredo Irmin Fest (May 13, 1936 – October 8, 1999) was a bossa nova and jazz pianist, keyboardist, and bandleader from Brazil. Legally blind, he was born in Porto Alegre, Rio Grande do Sul, Brazil, and he died at 63 years old in Tampa Bay, Florida. He was husband of the composer Lili Fest and father of the guitarist Phill Fest.

Biography
Manfredo Fest was of German descent: his father was a concert pianist from Germany who taught at University in Porto Alegre. Although he was blind, Fest learned to read music in Braille. His initial musical training had been classical, but at 17 years old, he became interested in the jazz works of George Shearing and Bill Evans. At college he gained steady work playing bossa nova in São Paulo.

In 1961, Fest graduated in piano from the University of Rio Grande do Sul. He also learned to play keyboards and saxophone. One year later, he started his musical career playing in bars, clubs and pubs. In 1963, he recorded his first LP, called Bossa nova, nova bossa. In this album, he counted with Humberto Clayber (bass), Antonio Pinheiro (drums) and Hector Costita (saxophone and flute).

In the 1970s he traveled to the United States where he worked with Sérgio Mendes. His American debut album Manifestations was released in 1978. He was relatively obscure, but worked with noteworthy groups including Béla Fleck and the Flecktones. Fest was a semi-regular at Fandango's on Siesta Key, near Sarasota, Florida.

Fest died of liver failure at the age of 63 in Tampa, Florida, not far from his home in Palm Harbor, where he had lived for 12 years.

Discography
1961: Classicos Dos Boleros
1963: Bossa nova, nova bossa
1963: Evolução
1965: Manfredo Fest Trio
1965: Some people
1966: Alma Brasiliera
1969: Bossa Rio
1970: Alegria
1972  After Hours
1972: Bossa rock blues
1976: Brazilian Dorian dream
1978: Manifestations
1987: Braziliana  (DMP)
1989: Jungle Cat (DMP)
1992: Manfredo Fest and friends
1994: Oferenda
1995: Começar de novo (To begin again)
1996: Fascinating rhythm
1997: Amazonas
1998: Just Jobim (DMP) [SACD]

References

External links
Jazz House on Manfredo Fest
Music Match guide

Bossa nova pianists
Bossa nova keyboardists
Brazilian jazz pianists
Brazilian jazz keyboardists
Latin jazz pianists
Latin jazz keyboardists
Jazz fusion pianists
Jazz fusion keyboardists
Jazz bandleaders
Brazilian people of German descent
Blind musicians
1936 births
1999 deaths
20th-century pianists
Federal University of Rio Grande do Sul alumni
Concord Records artists
Candid Records artists